The Komen Brinker Award for Scientific Distinction was established by Susan G. Komen for the Cure in 1992 to recognize leading scientists for their significant work in advancing research concepts or clinical application in the fields of breast cancer research, screening or treatment.

The intent of the award is to recognize scholars for a specific contribution, a consistent pattern of contributions, or leadership in the field that has had a substantial impact on the fight against breast cancer. The awardees are nominated and selected by a panel of their peers. Recipients are also invited to present their work in a lecture at the annual San Antonio Breast Cancer Symposium (SABCS). Brinker Award recipients each receive a $20,000 honorarium and a special citation of this distinction.

Recipients
Past recipients of the Komen Brinker Award for Scientific Distinction include
 V. Craig Jordan (1992), a pioneer in the use of tamoxifen
 Bernard Fisher (1992)
 Arnold J. Levine (1993)
 Richard J. Santen (1993)
 Marc Lippman (1994)
 Malcolm C. Pike (1994)
 C. Kent Osborne (1995)
 Helene S. Smith (1995)
 Edison Liu (1996)
 Umberto Veronesi (1996)
 Gabriel Hortobagyi (1997)
 David M. Livingston (1997)
 Leland Hartwell (1998), winner of the 2001 Nobel Prize for medicine or physiology who was recognized for his achievements in the understanding the cell cycle in the development of cancer
 Henry T. Lynch (1998)
 Mary-Claire King (1999), whose research isolated the BRCA1 and BRCA2 gene mutations associated with genetic forms of breast cancer
 Nancy E. Davidson (1999)
 Angela Brodie (2000)
 Dimitrios Trichopoulos (2000)
 Jay R. Harris (2001)
 Bert W. O'Malley (2001)
 Elwood V. Jensen (2002)
 Charles L. Loprinzi (2002)
 Mina J. Bissell (2003)
 Walter C. Willett (2003)
 Daniel Medina (2004)
 Larry Norton, M.D. (2004), whose dose-density approach to the administration of chemotherapy has revolutionized breast cancer treatment
 Trevor J. Powles (2005)
 Anita Roberts (2005), who co-discovered the TGF-beta molecule
 Evan Simpson (2006)
 George W. Sledge Jr. (2006)
 Leslie Bernstein (2007)
 Joe W. Gray (2007)
 Richard D. Gelber (2008)
 Aron Goldhirsch (2008)
 Patricia S. Steeg (2008)
 Benita S. Katzenellenbogan (2009) of the University of Illinois, for her work on the role of estrogen receptors in breast cancer
 Geoffrey Greene (2009)
 Ian Smith (2009)
 Jeffrey M. Rosen (2010)
 Soonmyung Paik (2010)
 Carlos L. Arteaga (2011), whose research has helped in explaining the role of key growth factor receptors and proteins in breast cancer pathogenesis
 Armando E. Giuliano (2011)
 Yosef Yarden (2012)
 Hyman B. Muss (2012)
 Edith A. Perez (2013)
 Gordon B. Mills (2013)
 Mitchell Dowsett (2014), Royal Marsden Hospital
 Joan Brugge (2014), Harvard Medical School
 Myles Brown (2015)
 Martine J. Piccart (2015)
 Charles Perou (2016)
 Monica Morrow (2016)
 Alan Ashworth (2017)
 Dennis Slamon (2017)
 Lisa M. Coussens (2018)
 Eric Winer (2018)
 Matthew J. Ellis (2019)
 Jane Visvader (2019)
 Geoffrey Lindeman (2019)

See also

 List of biomedical science awards

References

External links
List of award winners at the Susan G. Komen for the Cure website.

Awards established in 1992
Biomedical awards
Breast cancer
American science and technology awards